Bernard Baudean is a French para-alpine skier. He represented France in alpine skiing at six Winter Paralympics: in 1976, 1980, 1984, 1988, 1992 and 1994. In total, he won six gold medals, four silver medals and one bronze medal.

Achievements

See also 
 List of Paralympic medalists in alpine skiing

References

External links 
 

Living people
Year of birth missing (living people)
Place of birth missing (living people)
Paralympic alpine skiers of France
Alpine skiers at the 1976 Winter Paralympics
Alpine skiers at the 1980 Winter Paralympics
Alpine skiers at the 1984 Winter Paralympics
Alpine skiers at the 1988 Winter Paralympics
Alpine skiers at the 1992 Winter Paralympics
Alpine skiers at the 1994 Winter Paralympics
Medalists at the 1976 Winter Paralympics
Medalists at the 1980 Winter Paralympics
Medalists at the 1984 Winter Paralympics
Medalists at the 1988 Winter Paralympics
Medalists at the 1994 Winter Paralympics
Paralympic gold medalists for France
Paralympic silver medalists for France
Paralympic bronze medalists for France
Paralympic medalists in alpine skiing
20th-century French people